The following table gives the percentages of municipal waste that is recycled, incinerated, incinerated to produce energy and landfilled.

Notes

References

Energy conversion
Waste management